Cherukuri Rajkumar (alias Azad) (1952 – 1 July 2010) was the spokesperson and one of the seniormost members of the Central Politburo of the banned Maoist group Communist Party of India (Maoist). On 1 July 2010, he was killed by Andhra Pradesh Police in an encounter.

Early life
Rajkumar was born in Krishna district of Andhra Pradesh. He completed his school education from Sainik School Korukonda and graduated from Regional Engineering College, Warangal, the fountainhead of Left ideology in Andhra in the 1970s. He completed his MTech, from Andhra University College of Engineering, Visakhapatnam and became a leader of the Radical Students Union which was a breeding ground for many Naxalites.

Naxal activities
Rajkumar then joined the People's War Group on whose behalf he used negotiate arms deals and training in handling of weapons and explosives and he went underground. But cases of threat and intimidation apart, he did not have a police record in Andhra Pradesh. After Maoist parties merged to form the CPI (Maoist), he had been handling mostly political affairs of the party. Rajkumar was underground for 30 years and assumed several aliases including Madhav, Gangadhar, Madhu and Uday. He was an ideologue who had specialised in field-craft as well. Azad was arrested in 1975 and 1978 and jumped bail, carrying a reward of Rs. 1.2 million on his head. He went underground in 1979. He was an accused in the killing of Congress legislator C Narsi Reddy along with 10 others in Mahbubnagar district on 15 August 2005. Apart from being the central committee member, he was also the member of the politburo, the highest policy making body of the organisation.

Encounter
On 1 July 2010, Rajkumar was killed by the Andhra Pradesh Police in Jogapur forest area near Sarkapalli in Adilabad district of the state, near the border with Maharashtra. He was killed along with few others including journalist Hemchandra Pandey. Police also recovered an AK-47, a 9 mm pistol and rucksacks with food. As per the police the encounter started at around 10 pm on 30 June 2010 and continued till 3.30 am, the next day and that 20 Maoists were involved in the exchange of fire. Maoist sympathiser Vara Vara Rao filed a petition in the Andhra Pradesh High Court. However the High Court rejected the petition. Pandey's wife and Swami Agnivesh had filed a petition in the court, seeking an independent probe into the encounter killing. The Supreme Court of India had ordered for a Central Bureau of Investigation probe in April 2011 and CBI in March 2012, submitted the probe report before the Supreme Court terming the encounter as genuine and giving a clean chit to Andhra Pradesh police. Finally on 16 March 2012, after going through the report, Supreme Court concluded that the encounter was not a fake encounter.

Court observed "They (the CBI) have done a painstaking and thorough investigation," the bench said. "We have carefully gone through the sequence of events." It said that prima facie it does not appear to be a fake encounter. '"I went through the report very carefully," Justice Alam said. The bench agreed to the plea of advocate Prashant Bhushan that he be allowed to go through the final report of the CBI which held the incident as a genuine encounter. Court rejected the plea for fresh investigation.

References

External links
 International Campaign Against War on the People in India
 Azad, 'Maoists in India: Writings & Interviews', edited by Friends of Azad, 2010.
 Are We Living In A State That Mouths Peace But Shoots Its Messengers?, Tehelka
 An exclusive interview to The Hindu by Azad, spokesperson of the Communist Party of India (Maoist), The Hindu
 THE THIRD LETTER: The Maoist And The Undelivered Missive. Azad’s Death Is No Man’s Peace, Tehelka

1952 births
2010 deaths
Communist Party of India (Maoist) politicians
People from Krishna district
People shot dead by law enforcement officers in India
Anti-revisionists